The 2016–17 Belgian Second Amateur Division is the inaugural season of the division in its current format, as it replaces the former Belgian Third Division and is now placed at the fourth-tier of football in Belgium.

The division consists of three separate leagues, each containing 16 teams. Leagues A and B consist of teams with a license from the Voetbalfederatie Vlaanderen (VFV, the Dutch speaking wing of the Belgian FA), while league C contains teams with a license from the Association des Clubs Francophones de Football (ACFF, the French speaking wing of the RBFA). The champions from each of the three leagues will promote to the 2017–18 Belgian First Amateur Division. The fixtures were announced on 5 July 2016.

For the inaugural season the following teams will participate:
 The 14 teams in each of the groups A and B of the 2015–16 Belgian Third Division that either did not apply for a Belgian remunerated football license, did not qualify in the top two for direct promotion or did not win promotion through the promotion play-offs.
 20 teams promoted from the 2015–16 Belgian Fourth Division.

Belgian Second Amateur Division A

League table

Belgian Second Amateur Division B

League table

Belgian Second Amateur Division C

League table

Promotion play-offs

Promotion play-offs VFV
The teams finishing in second place in the Second Amateur Division A and Second Amateur Division B will take part in a promotion playoff first round together with three period winners from both divisions. These 8 teams from the VFV will play the first round of a promotion-playoff, with two teams qualifying for the Promotion play-offs Final. In division A, the first period was won by Petegem, while the second and third periods were won by Knokke. In division B, Tessenderlo won the first period, while periods two and three were won by Berchem Sport.

In division A, with the promotion of Knokke and the fact that Petegem did not apply for a remunerated license, the four participants were simply the highest finishers in the standings that had applied for a license: Aalst (3rd), Sint-Eloois-Winkel (5th), Brakel (6th) and Gent-Zeehaven (8th). In division B, no teams outside the top two applied for a license except for Rupel Boom. As a result only Tessenderlo and Rupel Boom took place in the play-offs while the two other places were not used. Therefore in the draw for round one of these play-offs, two teams received a bye.

VFV Round 1
As a result of the draw, both Brakel and Gent-Zeehaven received byes into round 2.

VFV Round 2

Aalst and Brakel qualified for the Promotion play-offs Final.

Promotion play-offs ACFF
The team finishing in second place in the Second Amateur Division C will take part in the promotion playoff first round together with three period winners. These 4 teams will play the first round of a promotion-playoff, with the winner qualifying for the Promotion play-offs Final. The period winners were RFC Liège (periods 1 and 3) and overall champions Châtelet.

As only Olympic Charleroi and La Louvière-Centre had received a remunerated license, only three teams played the play-offs instead of four, resulting in one team receiving a bye into round 2.

ACFF Round 1
As a result of the draw, RFC Liège received a bye into round 2.

ACFF Round 2

RFC Liège qualified for the Promotion play-offs Final.

Promotion play-offs Final
The two winners of the Promotion play-offs on the VFV side (Aalst and Brakel) and the winning team from the ACFF Promotion play-offs (RFC Liège) will play a final tournament together with the team that finished in 13th place in the 2016–17 Belgian First Amateur Division, Hasselt. The winner of this play-off promotes to (or remains in) the 2017–18 Belgian First Amateur Division.

Final Round 1

Aalst and RFC Liège qualified for the Promotion play-offs Final. By not progressing, Hasselt relegated from the Belgian First Amateur Division.

Final Round 2

2–2 on aggregate. Aalst promoted to the 2017–18 Belgian First Amateur Division on the away goals rule.

Relegation play-offs

Before the match, it was not known whether an extra VFV team would be relegated, which depended on the result of the promotion play-offs. If an ACFF team won the promotion play-offs, then an extra VFV team would be relegated. By winning the match, Tienen-Hageland was sure of avoiding relegation, while losing team Bornem were now dependent on the result of the only ACFF team in contention for promotion, RFC Liège. On 28 May 2017, RFC Liège lost the final match of the promotion play-off, resulting in Bornem being saved and avoiding relegation to the Belgian Third Amateur Division.

References

Belgian Second Amateur Division
Bel
4